The Jersey International,  also known as The Cavershamy International, was a professional tennis tournament for men and women played on outdoor hard courts. It was part of the ATP Challenger Series in 2008 and the ATP Challenger Tour in 2009 and 2010. As well, it was part of the ITF Women's Circuit as a 25K event annually in 2007 through 2009. The tournament was held annually in Jersey, Channel Islands.

Past finals

Men's singles

Men's doubles

Women's singles

Women's doubles

References

External links
Lawn Tennis Association (LTA) official website
ITF search

ATP Challenger Tour
ITF Women's World Tennis Tour
Hard court tennis tournaments
Sport in Jersey
Recurring sporting events established in 2007
2007 establishments in Jersey
Recurring sporting events disestablished in 2010
Defunct sports competitions in Jersey